Dhaka City Football Club is a football team from Dhaka, Bangladesh. The club currently a team of the Bangladesh Championship League.

History
On 10 November 2018, Bangladesh Football Federation gave the green signal to the club to participate in 2018–19 Bangladesh Championship League.

2018–19 season
Dhaka City FC had started their campaign with a 1–0 defeat against Farashganj SC.On 20 February 2019, debutantes Dhaka City FC registered their first victory in the Bangladesh Championship League with a 2–0 win over Wari Club. Aurongjeb scored the opening goal in the 60th minute before Sazzad Hossain Munna wrapped up the victory 20 minutes later.

They secured 8th position within 11 teams in the 2018–19 Bangladesh Championship League season. The club will play the Bangladesh Championship League next season as well.

2020–21 season
Dhaka City FC secured 11th position within 12 teams in the 2020–21 Bangladesh Championship League season. The club will play the Bangladesh Championship League next season as well.

Current squad

Professional league records

Club management

Team coaches

On 24 December 2018, the club make history in Bangladesh football by appointing Mirona Khatun as head coach, as she became the first ever female head coach in a male team in Bangladesh The team performance under different under coaches (as of 29 June 2021):

References

External links 
 Dhaka City FC on Mycujoo
 https://globalsportsarchive.com/team/soccer/dhaka-city-fc/44009/

Association football clubs established in 2018
Sport in Dhaka
Football clubs in Bangladesh
2018 establishments in Bangladesh